Pinakamamahal (International title: Beloved) is a 2006 Philippine television drama romance series broadcast by GMA Network. It stars Oyo Boy Sotto and Marian Rivera. It premiered on August 14, 2006 on the network's Dramarama sa Hapon line up replacing Agawin Mo Man ang Lahat. The series concluded on November 3, 2006 with a total of 60 episodes. It was replaced by Makita Ka Lang Muli in its timeslot.

Cast and characters

Lead cast
 Oyo Boy Sotto as Martin Padua
 Marian Rivera as Carissa Crismundo
 Pauleen Luna as Nanette Casayuran
 Danilo Barrios as Jeremy Dizon
 Danica Sotto as Amy Querubin
 AJ Eigenmann as Lito Arguelles

Supporting cast

 Hero Angeles as Michael Casayuran
 Maritoni Fernandez as Marikrissa Padua
 Lollie Mara as Sofia Padua
 Gary Estrada as Ricardo Padua
 Pinky Amador as Margie Crismundo
 Krystal Reyes as Cristine "Tintin" Padua
 Menggie Cobarrubias as Gustino "Father Gustin"
 Robert Seña as Edward
 Bing Loyzaga as Sister Salve Querubin

Guest cast
 Sandy Andolong as Sister Agatha Lucero
 Joyce Ching as young Nanette Casayuran
 Vice Ganda

References

External links
 

2006 Philippine television series debuts
2006 Philippine television series endings
Filipino-language television shows
GMA Network drama series
Philippine romance television series
Television series by TAPE Inc.
Television shows set in the Philippines